Peter Lambert (1 June 1859 – 28 February 1939) was a German rose breeder from Trier.

Life 
Peter Lambert was born on 1 June 1859 in Trier, Germany. He acquired a knowledge of roses working with his father Nicholas Lambert in the Lambert & Reiter nursery, later Lambert & Söhne (Lambert & Sons). The brothers Johann and Nicholas had started the firm in 1869 with Jean Reiter, a nurseryman. Peter trained at a Prussian school of horticulture and gained experience working in nurseries in France and England. In 1891 he started his own nursery, eventually employing more than seventy workers.

In 1900 he married Léonie Lamesch, daughter of the Luxembourg rose breeder. To her he had dedicated one of his dwarf Polyanthas crossing Polyanthas with Noisettes. He maintained good contacts with Luxembourg nurseries (Soupert & Notting, Gemen-Bourg, and Ketten Frères), who distributed his varieties.

Peter Lambert helped establish the Europa-Rosarium at Sangerhausen in 1904 and the rosarium in Zweibrücken in 1914. He was also a founder of the Verein Deutscher Rosenfreunde (German Rose Society). He became its director and edited its Rosen-Zeitung 1890–1911. He was a jurist for rose competitions in Saint Petersburg, Paris, Haarlem, London, Lyon and Florence.

Lambert's catalogues in the years 1914-1931 are a valuable treasure trove of the most important roses of his time.
Lambert's rose dedications (over 100 by 1914) make a survey of contemporary German wartime and pre-war society. There are the usual rose people and their relations. Likewise aristocratic and military worthies, though the sabre rattles more loudly than usual: the rose 'Herero-Trotha' celebrates von Trotha's genocidal efforts in German Southwest Africa. Danzig is declared in 1935 to be 'Deutsches Danzig.' There is an "economic adviser," a "financial adviser" and a "confidential adviser," no doubt prominent public servants. Other names show Lambert's interest in poets ('Hoffmann von Fallersleben'), wine-growing areas and chess players.

He died on 28 February 1939.

"Lambert's garden in the walls of the old Benedictine abbey in Trier and his collection of roses … were all destroyed during World War II." After the war, a street in Trier was named after him and a rose garden in Nells Park planted in his honour.

Rose breeding 
From the late 1890s Lambert began to breed his own rose varieties, introducing the first ones in 1899. The Alsatian Schmitt's Three Graces – the roses 'Thalia', 'Euphrosyne' and 'Aglaïa'– were promoted by Lambert and provided material for many of his early crosses.

For fifty years Lambert bred original and much admired hybrid teas ('Kaiserin Auguste Viktoria', 'Frau Karl Druschki'), Chinas ('Unermüdliche'), Hybrid perpetuals ('Moselblümchen'), Rugosa crosses ('Schneezwerg'), Pernetianas ('Von Scharnhorst'), Bourbon–China crosses ('Adam Messerich') and Multiflora ramblers ('Mosel').

Lambert selected roses for good health by avoiding parents that displayed a weakness for mildew or rust. As a result, a century later his roses remain among the healthiest … In 1905, Lambert named the vigorous, free-flowering and remontant shrub 'Trier' in honour of his home town. He then used 'Trier' to develop a distinct class of large, repeat-flowering Hybrid Musk shrubs and climbers with wonderfully handsome leaves and a deliciously strong scent. These became known as the Lambertianas.

Lambert and his firm survived World War I but

the defeat and humiliation of World War I weighed heavily on him … and he found the 1920s a difficult time to earn a living. His natural curiosity faded, and he failed to keep pace with the innovations of younger rose breeders … he stuck increasingly to his own breeding lines and seldom took in new genes from other breeders' breakthroughs.

Not surprisingly his production of new varieties declined in the 1930s, his own seventies. But the very late 'Mozart' and 'Martha Lambert' are striking and original.

Sortable list of Peter Lambert roses

References

Notes

Bibliography
 Charles Quest-Ritson, Climbing Roses of the World, Timber Press, 2003, pp. 99–105. . The best treatment in English and not just of climbers.

External links
 Help Me Find list for the breeder Lambert, Peter. The array of photos is incomparable.

1859 births
1939 deaths
German gardeners
German horticulturists
People from Trier
Rose breeders